The men's individual foil A at the 2012 Summer Paralympics in London took place on 4 September 2012 at ExCeL Exhibition Centre. This class is for athletes who have good trunk control and their fencing arm is not affected by their impairment.

Schedule 
All times are British Summer Time

Competition format 
The tournament started with a group phase round-robin followed by a knockout stage.

During a qualification round-robin, bouts lasted a maximum of three minutes, or until one athlete had scored five hits. There was then a knockout phase, in which bouts lasted a maximum of nine minutes (three periods of three minutes), or until one athlete had scored 15 hits.

Results

Qualification

Group A

Group B

Group C

Finals

External links 
 Wheelchair Fencing - Schedule & Results 
 Men's Individual Foil - Category A 

Wheelchair fencing at the 2012 Summer Paralympics